The 9×57mm Mauser is a cartridge based on the 7.92×57mm Mauser. It uses the identical 57 mm-long cartridge case, with the same shoulder angle, but necked up to accept a 9 mm-diameter bullet. Ballistically - but not dimensionally - it is indistinguishable from the 9×56mm Mannlicher–Schoenauer. It is currently regarded as a semi-obsolete calibre, although hand-loading keeps it alive.

Performance
Firing a relatively heavy bullet of 14–16 g (220–250 grains) at a modest velocity of 670–700 m/s (2,200–2,300 ft/s), the 9×57mm is low in noise and recoil, pleasant to shoot, and regarded as accurate and effective on all but the very largest, most dangerous game at distances out to 250–300 m (300-350 yd).

The cartridge's low velocity combined with the heavy, poorly streamlined bullet, gives the 9×57 a relatively poor trajectory, which makes it unsuited to shooting at longer ranges. This calibre was popular as a large-deer cartridge in Germany and Central Europe; and also in German spheres of influence in Africa in the early 20th century, such as German West Africa and German East Africa, where it was widely popular among European farmers and settlers for shooting plains game.  It also accounted for many lions and leopards. Its popularity was gradually eclipsed by the significantly more powerful, flatter-shooting, 9.3×62 Mauser cartridge. The CIP maximum average pressure (MAP) for the 9×57 is 280 MPa bar (40,600 PSI).

Firearms using the 9×57
Many beautifully-made sporting rifles in 9×57mm caliber, often dating from well before 1939, are still giving their owners good service today.  However, dependable, recently manufactured factory ammunition is increasingly expensive and hard to obtain, and many users must rely on handloading.

Many of these Mauser rifles were made from de-militarized World War I small ring M98 rifles by many gunsmiths throughout Germany, and usually these are rebored (oversized from 7.92×57mm). When barrels eventually wear out, 9×57mm rifles are generally rebarrelled in other, more modern calibres.

The cartridge was popular around the world and was even chambered in Remington Model 30 and Winchester Model 54 rifles.

Commercial production
Factory-loaded ammunition is now increasingly hard to come by, and most users handload, using either fire-formed 9×57 brass or modified 7×57 or 8×57 cases necked up to accept 9 mm diameter bullets.

Gallery

See also
 List of rifle cartridges
 Table of handgun and rifle cartridges
 9 mm caliber
 9.3 x 57mm Mauser

References 

Pistol and rifle cartridges